Sahibganj district is one of the twenty-four districts of Jharkhand state, India, and Sahibganj is the administrative headquarters of this district.

Divisions
Sahibganj district is divided into two subdivions: Sahibganj subdivision and Rajmahal subdivision. It is further subdivided into nine Community development blocks:(Sahibganj subdivision) Sahibganj, Mandro, Borio, Barhait (Rajmahal subdivision) Taljhari, Rajmahal, Udhwa, Pathna and Barharwa.

Economy
In 2006 the Ministry of Panchayati Raj named Sahibganj one of the country's 250 most backward districts (out of a total of 640). It is one of the 24 districts in Jharkhand currently receiving funds from the Backward Regions Grant Fund Programme (BRGF).

Demographics

According to the 2011 census Sahibganj district has a population of 1,150,567, roughly equal to the nation of Timor-Leste or the US state of Rhode Island. This gives it a ranking of 407th in India (out of a total of 640). Its population growth rate over the decade 2001-2011 was 23.96%. Sahibganj has a sex ratio of 948 females for every 1000 males, and a literacy rate of 53.73%. 26.8% of the population was from Scheduled Tribes.

At the time of the 2011 Census of India, 28.86% of the population in the district spoke Bengali, 21.86% Santali, 16.71% Hindi, 11.42% Khortha, 6.33% Urdu, 5.33% Bhojpuri and 3.68% Malto. 4.11% of the population spoke 'Others' under Hindi.

Politics 

 |}

Localities 
 

 Kodarjana
 Sahibganj

References

External links
 Official district government website

Districts of Jharkhand
 
Minority Concentrated Districts in India
1983 establishments in Bihar